The QNI North Queensland Challenge Trophy was a football (soccer) friendly tournament the summer of 2006, hosted in Townsville.

Overview 

The tournament was intended to warm up the Young Socceroos for the 2007 U-20 World Cup. The Young Socceroos were automatically invited to the tournament as hosts. Central Coast Mariners and Melbourne Victory were then invited to the tournament to represent the A-League and Changchun Yatai of the Chinese Super League were invited to represent Asia.

Teams that participated 

 Young Socceroos
 Central Coast Mariners
 Melbourne Victory
 Changchun Yatai

Tournament 

Each team played each other once in a round robin, after each team had played each other, the team that came 1st in the group played the team that came 2nd in the Grand Final, and the teams that finished 3rd and 4th played each other in a consolation match. Melbourne Victory finished 1st in the group followed by Changchun Yatai while the Young Socceroos and Central Coast Mariners finished 3rd and 4th respectively. Melbourne then played Changchun in the Grand Final where Melbourne finished the game 6-1 and broke the club record for biggest win.

Summary

Group Round
 Melbourne Victory 3-1 Changchun Yatai
 Young Socceroos 1-2 Central Coast Mariners
 Changchun Yatai 2-0 Central Coast Mariners
 Young Socceroos 0-4 Melbourne Victory
 Central Coast Mariners 1-3 Melbourne Victory
 Young Socceroos 1-4 Changchun Yatai

Consolation Match
 Central Coast Mariners 2-0 Young Socceroos

Grand Final

Overall Results

References

Under-19 association football competitions
Australian soccer friendly trophies
2006 in Australian soccer
Soccer in Queensland